Thung Hua Chang is a district (amphoe) of Lamphun province, northern Thailand.

History
The minor district (king amphoe) Thung Hua Chang was created on 1 February 1987, when three tambons were split off from Li district. It was upgraded to a full district on 4 November 1993.

Geography
Neighboring districts are (from the west clockwise): Li, Ban Hong, and Mae Tha of Lamphun Province; Soem Ngam and Thoen of Lampang province.

The Khun Tan Range stretches from north to south along the district.

Administration
The district is divided into three sub-districts (tambons), which are further subdivided into 35 villages (mubans). Thung Hua Chang is a township (thesaban tambon) which covers parts of the same-named tambon. There are a further three tambon administrative organizations (TAO).

References

External links
amphoe.com

Thung Hua Chang